New Ministers' Hill Ward is a ward located under Nagaland's capital city, Kohima. The ward falls under the designated Ward No. 15 of the Kohima Municipal Council.

Education
Educational Institutions in New Ministers' Hill Ward:
 Little Flower Higher Secondary School
 Mount Sinai Higher Secondary School

See also
 Municipal Wards of Kohima

References

External links
 Map of Kohima Ward No. 15

Kohima
Wards of Kohima